NAIDOC Week is an Australian observance lasting from the first Sunday in July until the following Sunday. The acronym NAIDOC stands for National Aborigines and Islanders Day Observance Committee, which was originally National Aborigines Day Observance Committee (NADOC). NAIDOC Week has its roots in the 1938 Day of Mourning, becoming a week-long event in 1975.

NAIDOC Week celebrates the history, culture and achievements of Aboriginal and Torres Strait Islander peoples. The week is celebrated not just in the Indigenous Australian communities but also in increasing numbers of government agencies, schools, local councils and workplaces.

History of the observance

Day of Mourning (1938)
The idea behind NAIDOC goes back to a letter written by William Cooper that was aimed at Aboriginal communities and at churches. It was written on behalf of the Australian Aborigines Progressive Association, an umbrella group for a number of Aboriginal justice movements. The association gathered together a wide circle of Indigenous leaders including Douglas Nicholls, William Ferguson, Jack Patten and Margaret Tucker. In 1937 they were preparing for what would become the famous Day of Mourning in 1938. It not only sparked a very effective one-off protest. It also stimulated a national observance that was at first championed by churches, and is now a national celebration:

W. Cooper Hon. Sec., AAL, 43 Mackay Street, Yarraville, 27 December 1937.

Australia Day 1938 Aborigines' Day of Mourning

The Australian Aborigines' Progressive Association (AAPA) of New South Wales has called on all aborigines in the advanced stages of civilisation and culture to observe a DAY OF MOURNING concurrently with the white man's DAY OF REJOICING to celebrate the 150th year of the coming of the white man to Australia. The aborigines, by this means, hope to call the attention to the present deplorable condition of all aborigines, of whatever stage of culture, after 150 years of British rule. It is expected that such action will create such sympathy on the part of the whites that full justice and recompense will follow.

The "DAY OF MOURNING" has been endorsed by the Australian Aborigines' League, the Victorian body, which also looks after Federal matters, and it is expected that meetings will be held at a number of places and suitable resolutions passed. This League now asks the Christian community to help us in another way.

We know that sympathy with the aborigines is widespread and growing and, because the aboriginal knows that the goodwill of the whiteman is essential to success they seek to justify the continuance of this sympathy. We now ask all Christian denominations to observe Sunday, 3rd January as ABORIGINES' DAY. We request that sermons be preached on this day dealing with the aboriginal people and their need of the gospel and response to it and we ask that special prayer be invoked for all missionary and other effort for the uplift of the dark people.

We regret the unavoidable delay in submitting our request, which was not avoidable in all the circumstances, but we feel that a suitable notice from you in your church press will give that wide publicity that is so essential.

Very sincerely yours,
W. Cooper.

The Day of Mourning before Australia Day 1938 in Sydney by the AAPA and around 100 further Aboriginal people made significant impact on the national conversation and triggered an invitation for Indigenous leaders to meet with Prime Minister Joseph Lyons.

The message to the churches got through too. Certainly, some churches were observing the day by January 1940 and it was nationally observed by 1946 at the latest.

NADOC day of remembrance (1957)
By 1957, the leaders of the movement decided to change the date from January to July. The National Aborigines Day Observance Committee (NADOC) formed and the first Sunday in July became a day of remembrance and celebration for Aboriginal people and heritage.

NAIDOC Week(1991)
In 1991 NADOC became NAIDOC (National Aborigines and Islanders Day Observance Committee), to recognise Torres Strait Islanders and to describe a whole week of recognition, rather than one day.

The committee's acronym has since become the name of the week itself.

COVID-19 impact 
In 2020, NAIDOC Week was disrupted by the COVID-19 pandemic in Australia, and postponed from July to 8−15 November 2020. However the national NAIDOC Awards, due to take place in Mparntwe / Alice Springs, were cancelled owing to continuing uncertainties. The 2021 National NAIDOC Awards ceremony was scheduled for 3 July 2021, but again cancelled. An event was then planned for 3 July at the Sydney Opera House. However, by July Sydney was in COVID-19 lockdown, and the Sydney ceremony was postponed. Due to the continuing pandemic, NAIDOC Week 2021 was also postponed; events for it in the Northern Territory were rescheduled to start on 11 July, but some events were cancelled.

NAIDOC Week activities 
NAIDOC activities are held across Australia, activities include cultural and educational activities in schools and workplaces and public displays.

NAIDOC Week activities might include listening to Indigenous Australian music, reading dream time stories, visiting Indigenous Australian websites on the Internet, organising an art competition and watching programmes on both Australian television (and their streaming services) related to the week.

Television stations such as the ABC and SBS structure programming across the week to celebrate events, actors and more on their various channels (as well as their streaming services).

Major celebratory events take place in Australia's major cities as well as in larger rural Aboriginal and Torres Strait Islander communities, including Alice Springs, Hermannsburg, Shepparton and Mildura.

National NAIDOC Awards
 
The National NAIDOC Awards Ceremony and Ball, celebrating the end of NAIDOC Week festivities is held in a different host city each year. The Ball features Indigenous food and live bands.

NAIDOC Poster Competition
The first NAIDOC poster was created in 1972 to promote "Aborigines Day". The protest nature of the poster continued until 1977 with titles like "Self Determination" and "Chains or Chance" publicising political change and a day of remembrance.

National NAIDOC themes and host cities

 2022: "Get Up! Stand Up! Show Up!"
 2021: "Heal Country, heal our nation"
 2020: "Always Was, Always Will Be"
 2019: "Voice Treaty Truth" (Melbourne)
 2018: "Because of her, we can!" (Sydney)
 2017: "Our languages matter" (Cairns)
 2016: "Songlines: The living narrative of our nation" (Darwin)
 2015: "We all Stand on Sacred Ground: Learn, Respect and Celebrate" (Adelaide)
 2014: "Serving Country: Centenary & Beyond" (Gold Coast)
 2013: "We value the vision: Yirrkala Bark Petitions 1963" (Perth)
 2012: "Spirit of the Tent Embassy: 40 years on" (Hobart)
 2011: "Change: the next step is ours" (Sydney)
 2010: "Unsung Heroes – Closing the Gap by Leading Their Way" (Melbourne)
 2009: "Honouring Our Elders, Nurturing Our Youth" (Brisbane)
 2008: "Advance Australia Fair?" (Canberra)
 2007: "50 Years: Looking Forward, Looking Blak" (Darwin)
 2006: "Respect the Past-Believe in the Future" (Cairns)
 2005: "Our Future Begins with Solidarity" (Adelaide)
 2004: "Self-determination-Our Community—Our Future—Our Responsibility" (Perth)
 2003: "Our Children Our Future" (Hobart)
 2002: "Recognition, Rights and Reform" (Sydney)
 2001: "Treaty—Let's Get it Right" (Melbourne)
 2000: "Building Pride in Our Communities" (Townsville)
 1999: "Respect" (Alice Springs)
 1998: "Bringing Them Home" (Broome)
 1997: "Gurindji, Mabo, Wik-Three Strikes for Justice-Celebrating the 30th Anniversary of the 1967 Referendum" (Brisbane)
 1996: "Survive—Revive—Come Alive" (Adelaide)
 1995: "Justice Not Tolerance" (Perth)
 1994: "Families Are the Basis of Our Existence—Maintain the Link" (Melbourne)
 1993: "Aboriginal Nations—Owners of the Land Since Time Began—Community is Unity" (Darwin)
 1992: "Maintain the Dreaming—Our Culture is Our Heritage" (Canberra)
 1991: "Community is Unity—Our Future Depends on Us" (Sydney)
 1990: "New Decade——Don’t Destroy, Learn and Enjoy Our Cultural Heritage" (Tasmania)
 1989: "The Party is Over—Let's Be Together as an Aboriginal Nation" (Darwin)
 1988: "Recognise and Share the Survival of the Oldest Culture in the World" (Brisbane)
 1987: "White Australia Has a Black History" (Perth)
 1986: "Peace—Not For You—Not For Me But For All" (Adelaide)
 1985: "Understanding: It Takes the Two of Us" (Melbourne)
 1984: "Take a Journey of Discovery – To the Land My Mother" (Adelaide)
 1983: "Let's Talk—We Have Something to Say"
 1982: "Race For Life For a Race"
 1981: "Sacred Sites Aboriginal Rights-Other Australians Have Their Rites"
 1980: "Treat Us to a Treaty on Land Rights"
 1979: "1979 International Year of the Child. What About Our Kids!"
 1978: "Cultural Revival is Survival"
 1977: "Chains or Change"
 1976: "Trucanini Last of her People Born 18?? . Died 1876. Buried 1976. Received Her Land Rights at Last"
 1975: "Justice for Urban Aboriginal Children"
 1974: "Self-Determination"
 1973: "It's Time For Mutual Understanding"
 1972: "Advance Australia Where?"

Football

See also 
National Reconciliation Week
National Sorry Day

References

External links

July observances
Australian Aboriginal culture
Awareness weeks
Observances in Australia
Winter events in Australia
Torres Strait Islands culture
Week-long observances